Tarzana Kid is an album by American singer-songwriter John Sebastian, released in 1974. The album was a commercial failure and did not chart. His next album which featured "Welcome Back" was his last for the Reprise label.

Reception 

In his retrospective Allmusic review, critic William Ruhlmann wrote "while this sounds like a hodgepodge, John Sebastian manages to pull it off with his usual aplomb."

Reissues 
Tarzana Kid was reissued on CD in 2007 by Collectors' Choice Music and in 2008 by Rhino Entertainment.

Track listing 
All songs written by John Sebastian except where noted.
"Sitting in Limbo" (Jimmy Cliff, Gully Bright) – 3:29
"Friends Again" – 2:28
"Dixie Chicken" (Lowell George, Fred Martin) – 3:49
"Stories We Could Tell" – 3:09
"Face of Appalachia" (Lowell George, John Sebastian) – 4:20
"Wildwood Flower" (Traditional) – 1:43
"Wild About My Lovin'" – 3:05
"Singing the Blues" (Melvin Endsley) – 2:22
"Sportin' Life" (Traditional) – 3:09
"Harpoon" – 2:23

Personnel

Musicians
John Sebastian – vocals, guitar, harmonica, autoharp, banjo, marimba, harmonica, dulcimer
Lowell George – slide guitar, guitar, harmony vocals
Jim Gordon – drums
Kenny Altman – bass
Milt Holland – drums
Amos Garrett – guitar
Russell DaShiell – guitar
Richie Olson – clarinet
The Pointer Sisters – backing vocals
Bobbye Hall – congas
Jerry McKuen – guitar
Buddy Emmons – pedal steel guitar
Emmylou Harris – backing vocals
Kelly Shanahan – drums
David Lindley – fiddle
David Grisman – mandolin
Ry Cooder – mandolin, slide guitar
Phil Everly – backing vocals
Ron Koss – guitar

Production 
Erik Jacobsen – producer
John Sebastian – producer
Donn Landee – engineer
John Boyd – engineer
Peter Granet – engineer
Steve Jarvis – engineer
David Paich – string arrangement

References 

1974 albums
Reprise Records albums
Collectors' Choice Music albums
John Sebastian albums
Albums produced by Erik Jacobsen